General Kittell may refer to:

Friedrich Kittel (1896–1973), German Wehrmacht lieutenant general
Heinrich Kittel (1892–1969), German Wehrmacht lieutenant general
Walther Kittel (1887–1971), German lieutenant general of medical services